Sally Jacobsen (June 12, 1946 – May 12, 2017) was an American journalist, foreign correspondent and editor whose career spanned 39-years at the Associated Press. In 1999, Jacobsen became the first woman to serve as the international editor for the AP, where she oversaw the news agency's overseas news bureaus. During her tenure as international editor, Jacobson supervised the AP's foreign coverage on the United States invasion of Afghanistan in 2001 and the 2003 war in Iraq. She was later promoted to AP deputy managing editor for operations and projects, where she edited the AP Stylebook.

Jacobsen grew up in Gunnison, Colorado. She received her bachelor's degree from Iowa State University and a master's degree in economics from Cornell University.

Jacobsen retired from the Associated Press in 2015 and resided in Croton-on-Hudson, New York. She died from cancer at Phelps Memorial Hospital in Sleepy Hollow, New York, on May 12, 2017, at the age of 70. Jacobsen was survived by her husband,  Patrick Oster, a novelist and retired managing editor for Bloomberg News; their son, Alex; and two Airedale terriers, Tazz and Gemma.

References

Associated Press reporters
American newspaper reporters and correspondents
American business and financial journalists
American editors
American women editors
American women journalists
California State University, Bakersfield faculty
Iowa State University alumni
Cornell University alumni
People from Croton-on-Hudson, New York
People from Gunnison, Colorado
1946 births
2017 deaths
Women business and financial journalists
21st-century American women